James B. Allardice (March 20, 1919 – February 15, 1966) was an American television comedy writer of the 1950s and 1960s.

Biography

James Burns Allardice Jr. was born to James Burns Allardice, a native of Scotland, and Lucinda (Lula) Masters Gladden. He was educated at McKinley High School in Canton, Ohio,. He went on to the College of Wooster, where he was active in theater, and graduated in 1941. During World War II he served in the US Army. Following the war, Allardice attended graduate school at Yale University and wrote the play At War with the Army under playwright Marc Connelly, who taught drama courses.
 At War with the Army ran 151 performances on Broadway in 1949. It was filmed in 1949 and released in 1950 in a production starring Dean Martin and Jerry Lewis.

Allardice is best known for his collaborations with writing partner Tom Adair on a number of American 1960s TV sitcoms including The Munsters, F Troop, My Three Sons, Gomer Pyle, USMC and Hogan's Heroes. Allardice won an Emmy in 1955 for best comedy writing for his work on The George Gobel Show.

He contributed to Alfred Hitchcock Presents, and wrote Hitchcock's prologues, intermissions and epilogues for all of the 359 episodes of the series, as well as many speeches for Hitchcock's public engagements.

He was married in 1943 to Alice Neff.

Death
Allardice died in Van Nuys, Los Angeles, California in 1966 from a heart attack, aged 46. He was buried at Forest Lawn Memorial Cemetery in Los Angeles.

References

External links

1919 births
1966 deaths
Writers from Canton, Ohio
United States Army personnel of World War II
American television writers
American male television writers
American comedy writers
Screenwriters from Ohio
20th-century American screenwriters
20th-century American male writers